Sciadotenia is a genus of flowering plants belonging to the family Menispermaceae.

Its native range is Panama to Southern Tropical Africa.

Species:

Sciadotenia acutifolia 
Sciadotenia amazonica 
Sciadotenia brachypoda 
Sciadotenia campestris 
Sciadotenia cayennensis 
Sciadotenia duckei 
Sciadotenia eichleriana 
Sciadotenia javariensis 
Sciadotenia mathiasiana 
Sciadotenia nitida 
Sciadotenia pachnococca 
Sciadotenia paraensis 
Sciadotenia peruviana 
Sciadotenia pubistaminea 
Sciadotenia ramiflora 
Sciadotenia sagotiana 
Sciadotenia solimoesana 
Sciadotenia sprucei 
Sciadotenia toxifera

References

Menispermaceae
Menispermaceae genera